Fraser Walker (born 1973) is a retired male Scottish swimmer specialising in the individual medley events.

Swimming career
Walker is best known for winning the silver medal in the Men's 200 m Individual Medley at the inaugural 1993 FINA Short Course World Championships in Palma de Mallorca, Spain, behind Germany's Christian Keller. He won a gold medal at the 1993 World Student Games in Buffalo, New York, USA and represented Scotland at the 1994 Commonwealth Games where he won the bronze medal in the 200 Metres Individual Medley.

In 1993, he became the first ever British swimmer to break the two-minute barrier for the 200 m individual medley with a time of 1 minute 58.35 at the World Championships in Palma De Mallorca. This stood as the British record for four and a half years and the Scottish record for 14 years.  He swam for Warrender Baths Club in Edinburgh.

At the ASA National British Championships, he won the 200 metres medley title in 1993 and 1995.

See also
 List of Commonwealth Games medallists in swimming (men)

References

 

1973 births
Living people
Scottish male swimmers
Male medley swimmers
Medalists at the FINA World Swimming Championships (25 m)
Swimmers at the 1994 Commonwealth Games
Commonwealth Games bronze medallists for Scotland
Commonwealth Games medallists in swimming
Universiade medalists in swimming
Universiade gold medalists for Great Britain
Medallists at the 1994 Commonwealth Games